was a village located in Futami District, Hiroshima Prefecture, Japan.

On April 1, 2004, Sakugi, along with the towns of Kisa, Mirasaka and Miwa, the villages of Funo and Kimita (all from Futami District), and the town of Kōnu (from Kōnu District), was merged with the expanded city of Miyoshi and no longer exists as an independent municipality.

External links
 Official website of Miyoshi 

Dissolved municipalities of Hiroshima Prefecture